Loux  is the name of a Greek beverage (non alcoholic) company based in the city of Patras. It was founded in 1950.

It produces various beverages and natural juices and exports also to Cyprus, Italy, Australia, New Zealand, Canada, Germany and the United States.

Sources

Loux is recognized as one of the “Strongest Companies in Greece” by ICAP Group
Export Leaders

Greek brands
Drink companies of Greece
Companies based in Patras